Pezhman Ghalehnoei (born January 29, 1992) is an Iranian hammer thrower. He competed at the 2016 Summer Olympics in the men's hammer throw event; his mark of 69.15 meters in the qualifying round did not qualify him for the final.

References

1992 births
Living people
Iranian hammer throwers
Iranian male athletes
Olympic athletes of Iran
Athletes (track and field) at the 2016 Summer Olympics